The DVD may refer to:

 The DVD (Napalm Death video), a 2001 DVD release of earlier performances by Napalm Death
 Lexy & K-Paul – The DVD, a 2005 DVD release of material by Lexy & K-Paul
 Milk Inc. – The DVD, a 2004 DVD release of material by Milk Inc.
 "The DVD", the first episode of The Amazing World Of Gumball

See also
 DVD (disambiguation)